Being a US Mountain State, winter sports recreation is a popular pastime in New Mexico, and accommodates skiers at its many ski resorts and ski areas. It includes Ski Apache, the southernmost major ski resort in the continental United States. Other ski areas in New Mexico include:

List of ski areas

Active ski areas
 Angel Fire Resort
 Enchanted Forest Cross Country Ski Area
 Pajarito Mountain Ski Area
 Red River Ski & Summer Area
 Sandia Peak Ski Area (New Mexico's first ski area, 1936) 
 Sandia Peak Tramway (longest aerial tramway in the Americas) 
 Sipapu Ski & Summer Resort
 Ski Cloudcroft
 Ski Santa Fe
 Ski Apache (southernmost major ski resort in the US, first gondola lift in the US)
 Taos Ski Valley

Former ski areas
 Agua Piedra
 Cedar Creek
 Eagle Creek
 Hyde State Park
 Powder Puff
 Sawyer's Hill
 Singing River Ranch
 Ski Rio
 Ski Sugarite
 Val Verde
 Woodlands

See also
 List of ski areas and resorts in the United States
 List of Colorado ski resorts
 Comparison of New Mexico ski resorts

References

Sports in New Mexico
Ski areas and resorts in New Mexico